Rocío Florido (born 16 January 1976) is a Spanish racewalker. She competed in the women's 20 kilometres walk at the 2004 Summer Olympics.

References

External links
 

1976 births
Living people
Athletes (track and field) at the 2004 Summer Olympics
Spanish female racewalkers
Olympic athletes of Spain
Place of birth missing (living people)
Mediterranean Games bronze medalists for Spain
Mediterranean Games medalists in athletics
Athletes (track and field) at the 2001 Mediterranean Games
20th-century Spanish women
21st-century Spanish women